Nova Oselica is a small settlement in the Municipality of Gorenja Vas–Poljane in the Upper Carniola region of Slovenia.

Name
The name Nova Oselica literally means 'new Oselica' (in contrast to nearby Stara Oselica 'old Oselica'). The origin of the name Oselica is uncertain, but is likely derived from the common noun osel 'donkey' (or from the surname Osel derived from that noun). A less likely possibility, argued against by medieval transcriptions, is that the name is derived from the plant name oselica 'pepper-saxifrage'. The toponym Oslica has the same etymology.

Church

The local church is dedicated to Saint John of Nepomuk. It was built on the site of an older church in the mid-18th century. The main altar is made of stone and dates to 1818.

References

External links 

Nova Oselica on Geopedia

Populated places in the Municipality of Gorenja vas-Poljane